Yunnanilus is a genus of small stone loaches that are endemic to southeastern China, especially Guangxi and Yunnan. They are found in rivers, streams and lakes; some species are restricted to caves.

Species
There are currently 35 recognized species in this genus, although other authorities cite fewer species and place a few other species formerly placed here into other genera such as Petruichthys and Micronemacheilus.

 Yunnanilus altus Kottelat & X. L. Chu, 1988
 Yunnanilus analis J. X. Yang, 1990
 Yunnanilus bailianensis J. Yang, 2013
 Yunnanilus bajiangensis W. X. Li, 2004
 Yunnanilus beipanjiangensis W. X. Li, W. N. Mao & R. F. Sun, 1994
 Yunnanilus brevis (Boulenger, 1893)
 Yunnanilus caohaiensis R. H. Ding, 1992
Yunnanilus chuanheensis 
 Yunnanilus chui J. X. Yang, 1991
 Yunnanilus cruciatus (Rendahl (de), 1944)
 Yunnanilus discoloris W. Zhou & J. C. He, 1989
 Yunnanilus elakatis W. X. Cao & S. Q. Zhu, 1989
 Yunnanilus forkicaudalis W. X. Li, 1999
 Yunnanilus ganheensis L. An, B. S. Liu & W. X. Li, 2009
 Yunnanilus jinxiensis Y. Zhu, L. N. Du & X. Y. Chen, 2009
 Yunnanilus longibarbatus X. Gan, X. Y. Chen & J. X. Yang, 2007
 Yunnanilus longibulla J. X. Yang, 1990
 Yunnanilus macrogaster Kottelat & X. L. Chu, 1988
 Yunnanilus macrolepis W. X. Li, Tao & W. N. Mao, 2000 
 Yunnanilus macrositanus W. X. Li, 1999
 Yunnanilus nanpanjiangensis W. X. Li, W. N. Mao & Z. M. Lu, 1994
 Yunnanilus niger Kottelat & X. L. Chu, 1988
 Yunnanilus nigromaculatus (Regan, 1904) 
 Yunnanilus niulanensis Z. M. Chen, J. Yang & J. X. Yang, 2012
 Yunnanilus obtusirostris J. X. Yang, 1995
 Yunnanilus pachycephalus Kottelat & X. L. Chu, 1988
 Yunnanilus paludosus Kottelat & X. L. Chu, 1988
 Yunnanilus parvus Kottelat & X. L. Chu, 1988
 Yunnanilus pleurotaenia (Regan, 1904)
 Yunnanilus pulcherrimus J. X. Yang, X. Y. Chen & J. H. Lan, 2004
 Yunnanilus qujinensis L. N. Du, Y. F. Lu & X. Y. Chen, 2015
 Yunnanilus sichuanensis R. H. Ding, 1995
 Yunnanilus spanisbripes L. An, B. S. Liu & W. X. Li, 2009
 Yunnanilus tigerivinus Li & Duan, 1999
 Yunnanilus yangzonghaiensis Cao & Zhu, 1989

References

 
Fish of Asia
Taxa named by John Treadwell Nichols
Taxonomy articles created by Polbot